The Chlotrudis Society for Independent Films is a nonprofit organization that honors outstanding achievement in independent and world cinema. The organization gives out the Chlotrudis Awards. Membership in the Society includes "the Boston film community, ... critics, film festival programmers, theater exhibitors, and representatives from consulates in Boston." The winners for the 27th annual Awards were announced on March 21, 2021. 

The organization was founded in 1994 by Michael Colford and was named after his and his boyfriend Trent's two cats, Chloe and Gertrudis.

Chlotrudis Awards 
The Chlotrudis Awards are given out annually, beginning in 1995. According to Society by-laws, to be eligible for an award, "a film cannot have been released on more than 1,000 screens nationally during its first four weeks. Films that only play festivals or are released direct to DVD are not eligible."

The Chlotrudis Awards were presented publicly beginning in 2000. They are given out in a ceremony usually held at the Brattle Theatre in Harvard Square, Cambridge, Massachusetts. As with the Academy Awards, Chlotrudis Award presentations involve live music and dance, movie clips, award envelopes, and a trophy (in this case, of a cat on a stick).

Special guests at past ceremonies have included Philip Seymour Hoffman, Agnès Godard, Elliot Page, Genevieve Bujold, Maury Chaykin, and Paprika Steen.

Current award categories 
 Best Movie
 Buried Treasure
 Best Director
 Best Actress
 Best Actor
 Best Supporting Actress
 Best Supporting Actor
 Best Original Screenplay
 Best Adapted Screenplay
 Best Music in a Film
 Best Editing
 Best Cinematography
 Best Production Design
 Best Ensemble Cast
 Best Documentary

Notes

References

External links

 Chlotrudis Awards at the Internet Movie Database

American film critics associations
Cinema of Massachusetts
Entertainment industry societies
Film-related professional associations
Organizations established in 1994
Non-profit organizations based in the United States